Stoke is a suburb of Nelson in New Zealand, located between Richmond and Tāhunanui. Stoke was named by William Songer, the personal servant of Arthur Wakefield, after his birthplace Stoke-by-Nayland in Suffolk.

In 2010 it was voted the "Keep New Zealand Beautiful People's Choice Best Place in New Zealand".

A group of streets in Stoke, between Main Road Stoke and Nayland Road, are named after famous literary figures: Kipling, Tennyson, Keats, Shelley, Marlowe, Browning, Dickens, Homer and Coleridge.

Facilities

Saxton's Field is an outdoor sports ground with softball, cricket, football, and hockey fields, a court for netball and an archery programme. 

Saxtons' Stadium is a home of indoor sports such as futsal, handball, table tennis and volleyball, and the home of the basketball team Nelson Giants.

Isel Park is an historic park and house, which form part of the legacy left by the Marsden family of Stoke. It includes the Isel Park research facility which is part of the Nelson Provincial Museum.

The Stoke Hand sculpture is located outside Stoke library.

Demographics

Stoke had a population of 18,672 at the 2018 New Zealand census, an increase of 1,884 people (11.2%) since the 2013 census, and an increase of 3,489 people (23.0%) since the 2006 census. There were 7,221 households. There were 8,889 males and 9,792 females, giving a sex ratio of 0.91 males per female, with 3,237 people (17.3%) aged under 15 years, 2,991 (16.0%) aged 15 to 29, 8,088 (43.3%) aged 30 to 64, and 4,353 (23.3%) aged 65 or older.

Ethnicities were 89.7% European/Pākehā, 10.4% Māori, 2.3% Pacific peoples, 4.4% Asian, and 2.1% other ethnicities (totals add to more than 100% since people could identify with multiple ethnicities).

The proportion of people born overseas was 17.7%, compared with 27.1% nationally.

Although some people objected to giving their religion, 53.8% had no religion, 35.4% were Christian, 0.5% were Hindu, 0.1% were Muslim, 0.7% were Buddhist and 2.3% had other religions.

Of those at least 15 years old, 2,466 (16.0%) people had a bachelor or higher degree, and 3,393 (22.0%) people had no formal qualifications. The employment status of those at least 15 was that 6,930 (44.9%) people were employed full-time, 2,394 (15.5%) were part-time, and 396 (2.6%) were unemployed.

Education

Nelson Christian Academy is a co-educational private Christian primary school for Year 1 to 8 students.

Local high schools include Nayland College, a state school in Nayland, and Garin College, a Catholic school in Richmond.

References

External links
 Map of Stoke

Suburbs of Nelson, New Zealand
Populated places in the Nelson Region
Populated places around Tasman Bay / Te Tai-o-Aorere